Burmanak (also Romanized as Būrmānak and Boormanak; also known as Bormānakī, Būryānak, Loshgin, Loshjīn, and Lūshgīn) is a village in Niyarak Rural District, Tarom Sofla District, Qazvin County, Qazvin Province, Iran. At the 2016 census, its population was 117 in 28 families.

References 

Populated places in Qazvin County